Tokyo Park or  is a 2011 Japanese drama film directed by Shinji Aoyama. It is based on the novel Tokyo Koen by Yukiya Shoji. It was released in Japanese cinemas on 18 June 2011.

Plot
Miura Haruma takes on the role of Koji, a college student aiming to become a professional photographer. One day, he receives an unusual request to shadow the client's girlfriend and take pictures of her; this assignment leads to subtle changes in his relationships with the women around him. Nana Eikura plays the ex-girlfriend of Koji's childhood friend, while Manami Konishi plays Koji's sister after one of her parents remarries, and Haruka Igawa plays the woman that Koji is photographing.

Cast
 Haruma Miura as Koji Shida
 Nana Eikura as Miyu Tominaga
 Manami Konishi as Misaki Shida
 Haruka Igawa as Yurika Hatsushima
 Shota Sometani as Hiro Takai
 Yo Takahashi as Takashi Hatsushima 
 Takashi Ukaji as Kenichi Haraki

Release
Tokyo Koen was showcased at the 64th Locarno International Film Festival to compete for the Golden Leopard award in August 2011. The film was awarded a special Golden Leopard to honor Aoyama's career.

Reception
Mark Shilling of The Japan Times gave the film a rating of 3.5 stars out of five. He noted that the film was "a new outlook and approach" by the director Shinji Aoyama. He described the character Koji as "an amiable, passive empty slate on which the more aggressive, knowing types around him can write their own dramas". Neil Young of The Hollywood Reporter said Tokyo Park was Aoyama's most mainstream, conventional film. He cited "the insipid blandness of a daytime soap-opera, lacking anything resembling urgency, edge or originality", saying that the cinematography was "picturesquely banal" and the score was "jauntily intrusive". Jay Weissberg of Variety felt that the film existed in an airless state despite its outdoor sequences.

References

External links
 

2011 films
2011 drama films
Japanese drama films
2010s Japanese-language films
2010s Japanese films